MBD or MBd may refer to:

 Man bites dog (journalism), a shortened version of an aphorism in journalism
 Maxwell–Boltzmann distribution, a probability distribution in physics and chemistry
Megabaud (MBd), equal to one million baud, symbol rate in telecommunications
 Member Board of Directors
 Metabolic bone disease
 Methyl-CpG-binding domain protein 2 a protein which bind the DNA on its methyl-CpG
 Microsoft Business Division, responsible for making Microsoft Office
 Minimal brain dysfunction or minimal brain damage, obsolete terms for attention deficit hyperactivity disorder, dyslexia and other learning disabilities
 Model-based definition, a method of using 3D CAD information to provide product specifications
 Model-based design, a mathematical and visual method of addressing problems associated with designing complex control, signal processing and communication systems
 Mordechai Ben David, a Jewish singer and recording artist
 Motherboard, a computer component
 Multibody dynamics
 Murder by Death (band), an indie rock band
 My Brightest Diamond, chamber rock band of Shara Worden